Topanicë is a village in the Kamenicë municipality, eastern Kosovo.

Notes

References

Villages in Kamenica, Kosovo